East London Coast Nature Reserve is a protected area in Eastern Cape Province, South Africa that is managed by Eastern Cape Parks. It covers an area of 3,424 hectares and incorporates 12 smaller nature reserves and protected areas.

The main reasons for its existence are the preservation of the region's biodiversity, protection of natural vegetation and management of extraterrestrial vegetation.

Parks
The nature reserve is built up from various disconnected smaller parks, and has a total area of 3,424 hectares. It extends from the Great Kei River in the east to the Tyolomnqa River (Chalumna) in the west, along about 250 km of coastline. The parks are the following:

Coastal parks
 Cape Morgan Nature Reserve
 Double Mouth Nature Reserve
 Cape Henderson Nature Reserve
 Gulu Nature Reserve
 Kwelera Nature Reserve (accessed through the Kwelera National Botanical Garden)
 Nahoon Nature Reserve
 Gonubie
 Kidd's Beach
 Kayser's Beach
 Chalumna
 Chintsa West

Inland parks
Among the parks located a little inland are the following:
 Fort Pato Nature Reserve
 Umtiza Nature Reserve

See also 
 South African National Parks
 Protected areas of South Africa

References

External links
 Eastern Cape Parks
East London Coast Nature Reserve

Nature reserves in South Africa
Eastern Cape Provincial Parks
Protected areas of the Eastern Cape